The 1932 County Championship was the 39th officially organised running of the County Championship. Yorkshire County Cricket Club won the championship title for the second successive year.

Percy Holmes and Herbert Sutcliffe set a new first-class opening partnership record of 555 for Yorkshire against Essex at Leyton.

Table
15 points for a win
7.5 points to each side in a match where the scores finish level
5 points for first-innings lead in a drawn match
3 points for first-innings deficit in a drawn match
4 points to each side where the first-innings scores are level in a drawn match or where there is no result on first innings or where there is no play.

References

1932 in English cricket
County Championship seasons